Newsline Mindanao is the defunct flagship weekday newscast of the Sonshine Media Network International with the latest local news, business news, health news & sports news. It was anchored by Michelle Cruiz and Maribel Lanticse.

Staff

Anchors
 Michelle Cruiz
 Maribel Lanticse
 Jade Calabroso
 Jason Fabular
 Merriam Hagnaya

Reporters
 Agnes Almerol
 Carlo Catiil
 Marjorie Corbo
 Nyle de Gracia
 Bluesette de Guzman
 Catherina Fournier
 Mary Ann Geralla
 Troy Gomez
 Thowens Granito(Cltv36reporters
 Dehmee Joy Gubuan
 Muriel Iturralde
 Aileen Navarro
 Angely Reyes
 Richard Reyes
 Jhomel Santos
 Reynald Tapel

References

See also
Sonshine Media Network International

Sonshine Media Network International
Philippine television news shows
Television in Davao City
2006 Philippine television series debuts
2010 Philippine television series endings